Rabbi Isaac ben Abraham Aboab (Hebrew: רבי יצחק בן אברהם אבוהב;  1300) also known by his magnum opus, Menorat ha-Maor, was an early 14th century Spanish Talmudic scholar and Kabbalist. He is known for his intellectual approach to rabbinic literature, which he juxtaposed with contemporary Spanish Kabbalah.

Biography 
Probably born in Aragon, his father Rav Abraham Aboab, had a close relationship with the Crown of Aragon, being gifted land and a heraldic achievement by James I of Aragon in 1263. In his early years Rabbi Isaac worked as a merchant, later moving to Toledo, Castile around 1300. In Toledo, he headed his own yeshiva, and amongst his pupils was Jacob Berab. He mostly taught Jewish ethics, later serving in the rabbinate in Toledo. Towards the end of his life, he devoted much of his time to literary work and to preaching, as he found that great Talmudic scholars and important seats of learning of his time to be antiquated. In his time, the Jews for whom he wrote still understood and spoke Arabic and he belonged to a period of intellectual decline when men took naturally to eclecticism. He combined extensive rabbinical knowledge with philosophical erudition, and was fond of mystic interpretation of the Mosaic laws and ceremonies. He often quoted Aristotle and Plato, though only from secondary sources, and endeavored to illustrate passages from the Talmud and the midrashic literature, with which he was especially familiar. He is sometimes confused with his great-great-grandson Isaac Aboab II, who was a bible commentator in Castile in the late 15th century.

Works
Aboab wrote three books:
Aron Ha-Edut (ארון העדות) ("The Ark of the Testimony") - The work traces various ritual laws to their Talmudic sources, as well as the decisions of the Geonim and later interpretations. It is divided (following the Ten Commandments) into ten sections, each subdivided into chapters and paragraphs.
Shulḥan Ha-Panim (שלחן הפנים) ("Table of the Showbread") - The work relates to the prayers and benedictions. It is divided into twelve sections, symbolizing the twelve loaves of the showbread in the Tabernacle. Both works unfortunately are lost.
Menorat Ha-Maor (מנורת המאור) ("The Menorah of Light") - The work is a collection of midrashic sermons.

Menorat haMaor

Menorat haMaor has survived and won considerable fame for the author, though in his humility he assures his readers that he composed it chiefly for his own use as a public speaker. But besides this it has contributed probably more than any other medieval book to the popularization of rabbinical lore and to the religious edification and elevation of the masses. It belongs to that class of ethical works which sprang up in the 13th century in a time of reaction against the one-sided manner in which Talmudic studies had been previously pursued.

Aboab says in the preface of this work, "These Talmudists consider it their duty to propose difficult questions and answer them in a witty and subtle manner, but leave unnoticed the precious pearls that lie upon the bed of the Talmudic ocean, the aggadic passages (similar to Midrash) so rich in beauty and sweetness." He conceived, therefore, the plan of grouping together the rich material stored up in the vast treasure-house of Aggadah from the religious and ethical point of view, and of presenting it in a book, intending by it to illumine the minds and the hearts of his coreligionists. Alluding to the seven-armed Menorah in the Tabernacle, he divided the book into seven sections, each of which bears the title of Ner or "Lamp" subdivided into separate parts and chapters. The seven "Nerim" or sections are:

 "Do not to chase after luxuries" - Divided into three sections about jealousy, lust, and respect. 
 "Do not speak sinfully" - Divided into ten sections about frivolousness speech, lying, flattery, slander, humiliation of others, keeping secrets, fighting with others, tiredness, life purpose, and the sin of insulting others. 
 "Keep the commandments" - Divided into ten sections about circumcision, the duty of the father to his son, prayer, honouring Shabbat and Yom Kippur, honouring one's father and mother, marriage, charity, volunteering, honesty in court, and the pursuance of mitzvoth. 
 "Matters of Talmud Torah" - Divided into four sections about the importance of setting time to learn Torah, the reward of learning Torah, Torah wisdom, and the importance of respecting Torah sages. 
 "Repentance" - Divided into three sections about matters of repentance, the days of repentance, and the torment of sin. 
 "Living in peace" - Divided into two sections about respecting others and advice on how to live peacefully.
 "Humility" - Divided into two sections about the importance of humility and the sin of humiliation. 

Aboab supplied to the average reader a great need of the time. Its skillful arrangement of the various Biblical and rabbinical topics and its warm tone of deep earnestness and sincerity could not fail to appeal to the popular heart. The work was translated into Spanish and read to attentive assemblies of the people, particularly to those not versed in the Law. It thus became the household book of the medieval Jews. It was published with a Spanish translation (Leghorn, 1657), with a Hebrew commentary and a Judæo-German translation by Moses Frankfurter (Amsterdam, 1701), with a modern German translation by Jacob Raphael Fürstenthal and Benzion Behrend (Krotoschin, 1844–46). It was translated also into modern Yiddish, in Wilna, 1880. The book should not be confused with a work of the same name by Israel Alnaqua.

Abuhav synagogue 
It is said that after their expulsion from Spain in 1492, Jewish exiles arrived in the Land of Israel carrying a Torah scroll scribed by Rabbi Isaac. Tradition claims that he designed a synagogue while in Spain, incorporating kabbalistic symbols into the design, which served as the building plan for the synagogue named for him in Tsfat, known as the Abuhav Synagogues.

See also 

 Menorat ha-Maor - Hebrewbooks

References

14th-century Castilian rabbis
Place of birth unknown
Sephardi rabbis
Talmudists
Year of birth unknown
Year of death unknown